"Never Keeping Secrets" is the second single released from Babyface's album For the Cool in You. It peaked at number 15 on the U.S. Hot 100 chart and at no. 3 on the U.S. R&B chart.

The song was performed by J.P. Molfetta on American Idol.

A cover of the song by Spragga Benz and Wayne Wonder reached number 1 in Jamaica in 1994.

Charts

Weekly charts

Year-end charts

References

Babyface (musician) songs
Contemporary R&B ballads
1993 songs
Songs written by Babyface (musician)
Song recordings produced by Babyface (musician)
Song recordings produced by L.A. Reid
Song recordings produced by Daryl Simmons
Epic Records singles